JTR is a Swedish boy band made up of John (born 1990), Tom Lundbäck (born 1993) and Robin Lundbäck (born 1994). The band's name is made up of the first letters of their given names John, Tom and Robin.

They appeared on the fifth season of The X Factor Australia a few months after becoming established in Australia. The fifth season of the Australian version premiered on the Seven Network on 29 July 2013. JTR finished seventh after being eliminated on 30 September 2013 of the show. Their debut album, Touchdown, was promoted by the band's debut single, "Ride". The album charted in both Australia and Sweden.

Career

2013: The X Factor Australia
JTR are originally from Sweden. They had reportedly just arrived the day they were scheduled to perform on The X Factor Australia where they auditioned with the Justin Bieber song  "As Long as You Love Me", with added rapping lyrics. After two weeks staying safe interpreting Ed Sheeran and Kylie Minogue songs, in week three, JTR landed in the bottom two for the first time and had a showdown contest with Barry Southgate. As a result, JTR were saved by judges Ronan Keating, Natalie Bassingthwaighte and Redfoo, with Southgate being sent home.

JTR were in the final showdown again in week four with Ellie Lovegrove. After the judges decision went to deadlock, it was revealed that Lovegrove had received the fewest votes and was eliminated, with JTR being saved yet again. JTR were eventually eliminated from the competition in week six following their performance of Hanson's "MMMBop", after Keating, Dannii Minogue and Redfoo chose to save Third Degree instead. JTR finished seventh overall in the competition.

Performances on The X Factor

 denotes week in the bottom two. denotes eliminated.

2014–present: Touchdown and Melodifestivalen
JTR proved popular despite their early elimination. Their debut single "Ride" was released on 3 February 2014, through Trinity Recordings. "Ride" debuted at Number 2 on the Australian Independent Chart.  JTR's debut studio album Touchdown followed on 7 March 2014, and debuted at number 44 on the ARIA Albums Chart.

With the release of their album, they also toured their home country Sweden with their album Touchdown through Sony Music Sweden. The album also charted in Sweden on Sverigetopplistan. It was announced in December 2014, that JTR would complete in the Melodifestivalen 2015, a Swedish music competition that would select Sweden's 55th entry for the Eurovision Song Contest 2015. Their song was called "Building It Up". The band made it to the final in Friends Arena.

Discography

Studio albums

Extended plays

Singles

Other charted songs

Album appearances

References

External links
Facebook
YouTube official

Swedish boy bands
Swedish musical trios
Sibling musical trios
Musical groups established in 2013
The X Factor (Australian TV series) contestants
2013 establishments in Sweden
Melodifestivalen contestants of 2015